Paul Kingsley Townsend FRS (born 3 March 1951) is a British physicist, currently a Professor of Theoretical Physics in Cambridge University's Department of Applied Mathematics and Theoretical Physics. He is notable for his work on string theory.

Education
He received his PhD from Brandeis University in 1976 for his dissertation The 1/N expansion of scalar field theories . Since then he has over 140 publications.

Work
In 1987, and Paul Townsend showed that there are no superstrings in eleven dimensions (the largest number of dimensions consistent with a single graviton in supergravity theories), but supermembranes.

Awards and honours
He was elected a Fellow of the Royal Society in May 2000.

References

External links

 
  (lecture by Paul Townsend)
  (Workshop: Octonions and the Standard Model, Perimeter Institute, 2021)
  (Workshop: Octonions and the Standard Model, Perimeter Institute, 2021)

1951 births
Living people
Brandeis University alumni
Cambridge mathematicians
British string theorists
Fellows of the Royal Society